Thermoflavimicrobium dichotomicum  is a Gram-positive and thermophilic bacterium from the genus of Thermoflavimicrobium which has been isolated from soil.

References

External links
Type strain of Thermoflavimicrobium dichotomicum at BacDive -  the Bacterial Diversity Metadatabase	

Bacillales
Bacteria described in 1964
Thermophiles